Clavus bilineatus is a species of sea snail, a marine gastropod mollusk in the family Drilliidae.

Description

The size of an adult shell varies between 12 mm and 24 mm. G.W. Tryon thought this species to be a synonym of Clavus pulchella (Reeve, 1845) (described as Drillia pulchella). He stated that the differences were only in the tuberculations being less sharp and the color not so bright, with a brownish tinge.

Distribution
This species occurs in the Indo-West Pacific, off the Philippines and Taiwan, and also off Papua New Guinea and Australia (Queensland).

References

 Reeve, L.A. 1845. Monograph of the genus Pleurotoma. pls 20–33 in Reeve, L.A. (ed). Conchologia Iconica. London : L. Reeve & Co. Vol. 1.
 Wells F.E. (1991) A revision of the Recent Australian species of the turrid genera Clavus, Plagiostropha, and Tylotiella (Mollusca: Gastropoda). Journal of the Malacological Society of Australia 12: 1–33
 Wilson, B. 1994. Australian Marine Shells. Prosobranch Gastropods. Kallaroo, WA : Odyssey Publishing Vol. 2 370 pp.

External links
 

bilineatus
Gastropods described in 1845